The General Counsel of the Department of Defense is the chief legal officer of the Department of Defense (DoD), advising both the Secretary and Deputy Secretary on all legal matters and services, and providing legal advice to Office of the Secretary of Defense organizations and, as appropriate, other DOD components.

The General Counsel develops the department's Legislative Program and coordinates DoD positions on legislation and Executive Orders; coordinates the appeals process for denied FOIA requests; oversees the performance and standards of DoD attorneys; establishes policy on general legal issues and determines the DoD position on specific legal problems; maintains repository for all international agreements coordinated, negotiated, or concluded by DoD personnel; and is "dual-hatted" as Director of the Defense Legal Services Agency.

This position was established by Reorganization Plan No. 6 of 1953 and by Defense Directive 5145.1, signed 24 August 1953. The position derived its responsibilities from one of the original three Special Assistants to the Secretary (established in 1947) and the Assistant Secretary of Defense (Legal and Legislative Affairs) (established in 1949).

Office holders

See also
 General Counsel of the Department of the Air Force
 General Counsel of the Army
 General Counsel of the Navy

References

External links
 Official website

Lawyers who have represented the United States government